Tu Dai Yong or Dai-Yong Tu (born 17 January 1968), born Dai Yong, is a Chinese-born table tennis player who represented Switzerland at the 1996 Summer Olympics.

References

Sources

1968 births
Living people
Table tennis players from Jiangsu
People from Taizhou, Jiangsu
Swiss female table tennis players
Swiss sportspeople of Chinese descent
Chinese emigrants to Switzerland
Chinese female table tennis players
Table tennis players at the 1996 Summer Olympics
Naturalised table tennis players
Olympic table tennis players of Switzerland